Sofia Elisabeth Andler-Kvarnstrand (born 6 September 1974) is a Swedish former equestrian. She competed in the individual eventing at the 2000 Summer Olympics.

References

External links
 

1974 births
Living people
Swedish female equestrians
Olympic equestrians of Sweden
Equestrians at the 2000 Summer Olympics
People from Trelleborg
Sportspeople from Skåne County